The Volovăț is a right tributary of the river Prut in Romania. It discharges into the Stânca-Costești Reservoir, which is drained by the Prut, near Ripiceni.

References

Rivers of Romania
Rivers of Botoșani County
Tributaries of the Prut